The Blue Water Bridge Authority was a Canadian Crown corporation responsible for the operation and maintenance of the Canadian side of the Blue Water Bridge in Point Edward, Ontario.  It was established on May 21, 1964 via the Blue Water Bridge Authority Act (Canada), which authorized it to provide highway traffic between Canada and the United States over the Blue Water Bridge.  It was granted exclusive rights to levy tolls on westbound traffic from Canada to the United States in order to offset the costs of operation, maintenance, and construction.

On April 26, 2002, the Authority became a Schedule III, Part I parent Crown corporation.  It was not required to pay taxes and not eligible to receive appropriations.  In September 2007, in accordance with Federal Identity Program requirements, the organization was officially titled Blue Water Bridge Canada.

On February 1, 2015, via House Government Bill C-4 Section 8 (assented to on December 12, 2013), the Blue Water Bridge Authority was amalgamated with St. Mary's River Bridge Company and Federal Bridge Corporation Limited to form a new corporate entity, Federal Bridge Corporation Limited, which currently owns and maintains the Canadian side of the Blue Water Bridge along with three other international bridges in Canada.

Facilities

The Bridge
The Blue Water Bridge Authority was responsible for the Canadian half of the Blue Water Bridge, a twin-span bridge over the St. Clair River at the mouth of Lake Huron. The American half of the bridge is separately owned and maintained by the Michigan Department of Transportation.

Canadian Plaza
There are several buildings and operations underneath the bridge on the Canadian side, collectively known as the Canadian Plaza. Among these are:

 Administration offices
 Canada Border Services Agency
 Canadian Food Inspection Agency
 Commercial brokers	
 Currency Exchange
 Customs brokers
 Duty Free Store
 Public washrooms
 Toll office

Business
The main source of revenue for Bridge operations on the Canadian side is the exclusive right, granted by the Canada Transportation Act (1996), to collect tolls from westbound traffic crossing the bridge from Canada into the United States.  Toll revenue from eastbound traffic into Canada from the United States is levied by and belongs to the Michigan Department of Transportation.  Toll rates are reviewed regularly, and both sides of the Bridge independently vary their rates based on fluctuating traffic conditions, trade agreements between Canada and the United States, foreign exchange rates between the two countries' currencies, and other factors.

Other sources of revenue include Duty Free Store sales, currency exchange fees, and interest on cash and investments.

Expenses include salaries and benefits, general and administrative expenses, and maintenance costs.

Community Integration
Approximately  of land owned by the Bridge has been identified as archaeologically sensitive according to the Cemeteries Act (Ontario), due to aboriginal burial sites in the area.  The land on which the bridge was built was once a hub for the Anishinaabe trade network that spanned the continent, and a place of celebration and ceremony. Today, responsibility for preserving the burial sites is held by the Aamjiwnaang First Nation band in Sarnia, Ontario.  Blue Water Bridge Canada and Aamjiwnaang First Nation have historically maintained an excellent working relationship, yielding conflict-free construction of the second bridge span, expanded parking lots, and other on-site development despite taking place on archaeologically sensitive land.  Officials from the Bridge and Aamjiwnaang First Nation continue to meet yearly to explore current and future issues of mutual interest.

Souls Memorial
As a symbol of co-operation and respect between the Blue Water Bridge and the Aamjiwnaang First Nation, a statue was unveiled just south of the bridge on June 21, 2003, hand-carved by Anishinaabe artist and sculptor Dennis Henry-Shawnoo from a single piece of sandstone.

Amalgamation
In October 2013, in order to streamline governance of the four separate Crown corporations that owned international crossings, the federal government announced its intention to amalgamate them under a single Crown corporation, the Federal Bridge Corporation Limited.  Bill C-4 Section 8 was passed into law December 12, 2013, and was fully in effect as of February 1, 2015.

See also

References

Former Crown corporations of Canada
Canadian companies established in 1964
Canadian companies disestablished in 2015
1964 establishments in Ontario
2015 disestablishments in Ontario